Mollenard is a 1938 French drama film directed by Robert Siodmak and starring Harry Baur, Gabrielle Dorziat and Pierre Renoir. It was also known by the alternative titles of Hatred and Capitaine Corsaire. The film's sets were designed by Alexandre Trauner. It is based on the novel of the same name by the Belgian writer . The film's plot divides sharply into halves, with the first an action thriller set in China while the second is a social drama with the title character struggling to cope with what he regards as the suffocating atmosphere of his home port in France.

The film was shot at the Joinville Studios in Paris and on location. An English-language version starring Victor McLaglen and Ruth Chatterton was planned but never made.

Plot
Captain Mollenard is an uncouth, almost piratical, commander of a merchant ship sailing out of Dunkirk. When the ship's owners discover that Mollenard has been selling arms on his own account, they decided to suspend him for six months. This horrifies his wife and children who have become used to his long absences. Mollenard hears news of his suspension while in Shanghai where he and his deputy Kerrotret are trying to offload their latest cargo of arms. They become entangled with a ruthless and treacherous criminal Bonnerot and his chief henchman Frazer. Although they succeed in wounding Bonnerot, he takes his revenge by having his men plant a timed explosive device on board Mollenard's ship.

When the device starts a fire Mollenard and his men abandon ship, and returning to France find that they are now being hailed as heroes. The company, for insurance purposes, has to play along with Mollenard's new status and have to consider giving him a new ship. Mollenard causes great offence to the respectable members of the town following his return, and his wife's hatred for him grows stronger. Mollenard suddenly suffers from a collapse in his health, and comes increasingly under the domination of his detested wife – to the point that he considers shooting himself. When Kerrotret is giving command of a new ship in place of Mollenard, he and the crew rescue him from the Mollenard household and take him to sea so that he can die where he belongs.

Reception
In France the film received a generally strong reception from critics. It was particularly popular with left-wing supporters of the Popular Front who celebrated its attack on respectable middle-class French society. When the film was released in the United States in 1941, critical reviews were much harsher. Variety described it as "a drab and tiresome character study of a man and wife who hate each other".

The film was not a commercial success. Siodmak followed it up with the noirish Personal Column, which did well at the box office.

Cast
 Harry Baur as Captain Mollenard  
 Pierre Renoir as Bonnerot
 Albert Préjean as Kerrotret 
 Gabrielle Dorziat as Mme. Mollenard 
 Gina Manès as Marina 
 Marta Labarr as Betty Hamilton 
 Ludmilla Pitoëff as Marie Mollenard 
 Foun-Sen as La chinoise  
 Liliane Lesaffre as L'entraîneuse 
 Marcel Dalio as Happy Jones 
 Jacques Louvigny as Truffier
 Robert Lynen as Jean Mollenard 
 Arthur Devère as Joseph 
 Maurice Baquet as Le Joueur D'Harmonica 
 Jean Clarens as Le Lieutenant 
 Robert Seller as Le préfet 
 Tran-Van as You 
 Georges Vitray as Firmin 
 Walter Rilla as Frazer  
 Jacques Baumer as Le secrétaire général 
 Lucien Coëdel as Le bosco 
 Roger Legris as Le radio 
 Armand Lurville as Dubailly d'Elbeuf 
 Georges Mauloy as L'abbé Mangin
 Marcel Melrac as Homme d'équipage 
 Pierre Sergeol as Fourcade  
 Marcel Pérès as Homme d'équipage
 Pierre Labry
 Ky Duyen  
 Rodolphe Marcilly
 Habib Benglia

References

Bibliography
 Alpi, Deborah Lazaroff. Robert Siodmak: A Biography. McFarland, 1998.
 Bock, Hans-Michael & Bergfelder, Tim. The Concise CineGraph. Encyclopedia of German Cinema. Berghahn Books, 2009.

External links

1938 films
French black-and-white films
French crime drama films
1938 crime drama films
1930s French-language films
Films directed by Robert Siodmak
Films set in Dunkirk
Films set in Shanghai
Seafaring films
Films based on Belgian novels
Films shot at Joinville Studios
Films scored by Darius Milhaud
Pathé films
1930s French films